Daniel Clavero (born 9 August 1968) is a Spanish former professional racing cyclist. He rode in seven editions of the Giro d'Italia and six editions of the Vuelta a España.

Major results

1995
 8th Overall Vuelta a España
1996
 3rd Escalada a Montjuïc
1997
 2nd Overall GP Jornal de Noticias
1st Stage 5
 3rd Overall Euskal Bizikleta
 3rd Subida al Naranco
 3rd Escalada a Montjuïc
 4th Overall Volta a Catalunya
 6th Overall Vuelta a España
1998
 2nd Overall Vuelta a Aragón
 3rd Klasika Primavera
 5th Overall Giro d'Italia
1999
 9th Overall Giro d'Italia

Grand Tour general classification results timeline

References

External links

1968 births
Living people
Spanish male cyclists
Cyclists from Madrid